Ça ira - Il fiume della rivolta, also released internationally as Thermidor, is an Italian collage film of documentary film and drama film genres directed by Tinto Brass. Taking its name from the popular revolutionary song Ça ira, the film is a critical narrative of 20th century revolutions from 1900 to 1962 and their legacy.

The first film directed by Brass, Ça ira - Il fiume della rivolta was produced in 1962 but it could be premiered at the Venice Film Festival in September 1964, to see theatrical release in December.

Narration/Voice
Enrico Maria Salerno
Sandra Milo
Tino Buazzelli

References

External links

1964 films
Italian drama films
Italian documentary films
Films directed by Tinto Brass
Collage film
1960s Italian films